The Historical Museum of Aruba is a historical museum in the city of Oranjestad in Aruba. It explains the history of the island and its inhabitants, in rural and urban areas.

The museum is situated in Fort Zoutman, an 18th and 19th-century military fortification.

The museum is administrated by the Fundacion Museo Arubano (Aruban Museum Foundation) since 1992.

See also 
 List of museums in Aruba

References 

History museums
Museums in Aruba
Buildings and structures in Oranjestad, Aruba